Al-Manara was a Palestinian Arab village in the Tiberias Subdistrict. It was depopulated during the 1947–1948 Civil War in Mandatory Palestine on March 1, 1948, by Jewish troops. It was located 5 km south of Tiberias.

History
Al-Manara contains Khirbat al-Manara and Khirbat Sarjuna.  The Crusaders referred to al-Manara as Menan. 

In 1881, the PEF's Survey of Western Palestine  noted at el Menarah:   "Ruined Arab houses, all basalt; no cisterns."

British Mandate era
In the 1922 census of Palestine, conducted  by the British Mandate authorities,  Manara had a  population of 122; 121 Muslims and 1 Jew, increasing in the 1931 census to 214 Muslims, in  33 houses.

In the 1944/1945 statistics  it had total population of 490 Muslims,  and together with the people of Nasir ad-Din  they had 4,185 dunams of land.  Of this,  4,172  dunams  of land were used for cereals, while 13 dunams were classified as built-up (urban) area.

1948, aftermath
Al-Manara was depopulated in early March, 1948.

There are no Israeli settlement on village land, the closest is  Poria Illit, located to the south of the site.
In 1992 the village site was described:  "The site has been levelled and is strewn with pieces of black stone. At its northern edge are walls of dark stone, with doum palm trees growing in their midst. At the site, a sign (in Arabic, Hebrew, and English) reads, "This is a historical site, please protect it"."

References

Bibliography

External links
   Welcome To  al-Manara
 al-Manara,  Zochrot
Survey of Western Palestine, Map 6:  IAA, Wikimedia commons 

Arab villages depopulated during the 1948 Arab–Israeli War
District of Tiberias